The Ole Miss Rebels men's basketball team represents the University of Mississippi in the sport of basketball. The Rebels compete in the NCAA Division I and the Southeastern Conference (SEC). They started the 2015–16 season playing home games at Tad Smith Coliseum on the university's Oxford campus, but played their final game in that facility on December 22, 2015. The Rebels opened a new on-campus arena, The Pavilion at Ole Miss, on January 7, 2016. The Rebels were led by 12-year head coach Andy Kennedy until his resignation on February 18, 2018. Tony Madlock, an assistant under Kennedy, served as the interim head coach for the remainder of the 2017–18 season. On March 15, 2018, the school hired former Middle Tennessee head coach Kermit Davis as the new head coach and was formally introduced on March 19. Davis was fired in his sixth season on February 24, 2023, after posting a 2-13 conference record with two games remaining on the schedule. Assistant coach Win Case took over as interim coach for the remainder of the season.

Ole Miss has made the NCAA tournament on eight occasions and reached the Sweet Sixteen in 2001. The Rebels have participated in the National Invitation Tournament (NIT) 11 times. In 2008 and 2010, they made it to the NIT Semifinals at Madison Square Garden. The Rebels have won the SEC Western Division five times.

History

Recent history 
Rob Evans arrived in Oxford in 1992 as the school's first black coach in a revenue sport. He led the Rebels to only their second and third NCAA Tournament appearances in school history, in 1997 and 1998. These were also the first 20-win seasons in school history; the Rebels had been one of the few longstanding members of a "power conference" to have never tallied a 20-win season

Evans left for Arizona State in 1998. His top assistant, Rod Barnes, took over at Ole Miss and compiled a record of 141–109 during his eight-year tenure. During his tenure, the Rebels reached the 1999, 2001, and 2002 NCAA Tournaments. The 1998-99 team notched the school's first-ever NCAA Tournament win, while the 2001 team advanced all the way to the Sweet 16. His tenure crested at that point, however, and he would not have another winning season after 2002.

Following the 2005-06 season, Ole Miss hired Andy Kennedy, and the Rebels tied for first place in the SEC West during the 2006–07 season. Led by the senior trio of Clarence Sanders, Bam Doyne, and Todd Abernethy, the Ole Miss men finished the year with a 21–13 record, including a 16–1 record at home inside Tad Smith Coliseum. They advanced to the second round of the NIT, before falling at Clemson. In his debut season with the Rebels, Kennedy was named the 2007 SEC Coach of the Year by the Associated Press after guiding Ole Miss, a preseason last-place pick in the SEC West, to its first division title and most wins since 2001.

In the 2012–13 season, Ole Miss won just their second SEC tournament title and made the NCAA tournament for the first time since 2002. Ole Miss also set a school record for most SEC wins in a season. Kennedy was again named SEC Coach of the Year. On February 23, 2013, Kennedy became the all-time winningest coach at Ole Miss.

Active NBA players
Terence Davis – Sacramento Kings

Active international players

Romello White (born 1998) - basketball player for Hapoel Eilat of the Israeli Basketball Premier League

Postseason

NCAA tournament results
The Rebels have appeared in the NCAA tournament nine times. Their combined record is 5–9.

NIT results
The Rebels have appeared in the National Invitation Tournament (NIT) 13 times. Their combined record is 15–13.

All-Americans

References

External links